Marcio Araújo de Lacerda (born on Leopoldina, Minas Gerais on January 22, 1946) is the former Mayor of Belo Horizonte in the state of Minas Gerais, Brazil.  Marcio Lacerda is a member of the Brazilian Socialist Party (PSB).

See also
 List of Mayors of Belo Horizonte, Brazil

References

1946 births
Living people
People from Minas Gerais
Mayors of Belo Horizonte
Brazilian Socialist Party politicians